Sport utility vehicles (SUVs) have been criticized for a variety of environmental and safety-related reasons. They generally have poorer fuel efficiency and require more resources to manufacture than smaller vehicles, thus contributing more to climate change and environmental degradation. Their higher center of gravity significantly increases their risk of rollovers. Their larger mass increases their momentum, which results in a larger braking distance and more damage to other road users in collisions. Their higher front-end profile reduces visibility and makes them at least twice as likely to kill pedestrians they hit. Additionally, the psychological sense of security they provide influences drivers to drive less cautiously or rely on their car for their perceived safety, rather than their own driving.

Safety
Generally, drivers in SUVs are safer than those in small and mid-size cars. In a 2011 IIHS survey of death rates per million registered vehicles per year in the US, by vehicle style, smaller cars fared worse than bigger ones. Four-door minicars have a death rate (per 100,000 registration years rather than mileage) of 82, compared with 46 for very large four-doors. This survey reflects the effects of both vehicle design and driving behaviour. Drivers of SUVs, minivans, and large cars may drive differently from the drivers of small or mid-size cars, and this may affect the survey result.

Rollover

A high center of gravity makes a vehicle more prone to rollover accidents than lower vehicles, especially if the vehicle leaves the road, or if the driver makes a sharp turn during an emergency maneuver. Figures from the US National Highway Traffic Safety Administration show that most passenger cars have about a 10% chance of rollover if involved in a single-vehicle crash, while SUVs have between 14% and 23% (varying from a low of 14% for the all-wheel-drive (AWD) Ford Edge to a high of 23% for the front-wheel-drive (FWD) Ford Escape). Many modern SUVs are equipped with electronic stability control (ESC) to prevent rollovers on flat surfaces, but 95% of rollovers are "tripped", meaning that the vehicle strikes something low, such as a curb or shallow ditch, causing it to tip over.

According to NHTSA data, early SUVs were at a disadvantage in single-vehicle accidents (such as when the driver falls asleep or loses control swerving around a deer), which involve 43% of fatal accidents, with more than double the chance of rolling over. This risk related closely to overall US motor vehicle fatality data, showing that SUVs and pickups generally had a higher fatality rate than cars of the same manufacturer.

According to Consumer Reports, as of 2009, SUV rollover safety had improved to the extent that on average there were slightly fewer driver fatalities per million vehicles, due to rollovers, in SUVs as opposed to cars. By 2011 the IIHS reported that "drivers of today's SUVs are among the least likely to die in a crash".

Braking problems
The cars with larger and heavy size like SUV require massive amounts of braking power so the reaction of an SUV to sudden braking can be very different from that of a normal car variant which drivers are more accustomed to.

Construction
Heavier-duty SUVs are typically designed with a truck-style chassis with separate body, while lighter-duty (including cross-over) models are more similar to cars, which are typically built with a unitary construction (in which the body actually forms the structure). Originally designed and built to be work vehicles using a truck chassis, SUVs were not comprehensively redesigned to be safely used as passenger vehicles. The British television programme Fifth Gear staged a  crash between a first generation (1989–98) Land Rover Discovery with a separate chassis and body, and a modern Renault Espace IV with monocoque (unit) design. The older SUV offered less protection for occupants than the modern multi-purpose vehicle with unitary construction. In some SUV fatalities involving truck-based construction, lawsuits against the automakers "were settled quietly and confidentially, without any public scrutiny of the results—or the underlying problems with SUV design", thus hiding the danger of vehicles such as the Ford Bronco and Explorer compared to regular passenger cars.

Risk to other road users

Because of greater height and weight and rigid frames, it is contended by Malcolm Gladwell, writing in The New Yorker magazine, that SUVs can affect traffic safety. This height and weight, while potentially giving an advantage to occupants of the vehicle, may pose a risk to drivers of smaller vehicles in multi-vehicle accidents, particularly side impacts.

The initial tests of the Ford Excursion were "horrifying" for its ability to vault over the hood of a Ford Taurus. The big SUV was modified to include a type of blocker bar suggested by the French transportation ministry in 1971, a kind of under-vehicle roll bar designed to keep the large Ford Excursion from rolling over cars that were hit by it. The problem is "impact incompatibility", where the "hard points" of the end of chassis rails of SUVs are higher than the "hard points" of cars, causing the SUV to override the engine compartment and crumple zone of the car. There have been few regulations covering designs of SUVs to address the safety issue. The heavy weight is a risk factor with very large passenger cars, not only with SUVs. The typically higher SUV bumper heights and those built using stiff truck-based frames, also increases risks in crashes with passenger cars. The Mercedes ML320 was designed with bumpers at the same height as required for passenger cars.

In parts of Europe, effective 2006, the fitting of metal bullbars, also known as grille guards, brush guards, and push bars, to vehicles such as 4x4s and SUVs are only legal if pedestrian-safe plastic bars and grilles are used. Bullbars are often used in Australia, South Africa, and parts of the United States to protect the vehicle from being disabled should it collide with wildlife.

Safety improvements during the 2010s to the present led automobile manufacturers to make design changes to align the energy-absorbing structures of SUVs with those of cars. As a result, car occupants were only 28 percent more likely to die in collisions with SUVs than with cars between 2013 and 2016, compared with 59 percent between 2009 to 2012, according to the IIHS.

Visibility and backover deaths
Larger vehicles can create visibility problems for other road users by obscuring their view of traffic lights, signs, and other vehicles on the road, plus the road itself. Depending on the design, drivers of some larger vehicles may themselves suffer from poor visibility to the side and the rear. Poor rearward vision has led to many "backover deaths" where vehicles have run over small children when backing out of driveways. The problem of backover deaths has become so widespread that reversing cameras are being installed on some vehicles to improve rearward vision.

While SUVs are often perceived as having inferior rearward vision compared with regular passenger cars, this is not supported by controlled testing which found poor rearward visibility was not limited to any single vehicle class. Australia's NRMA motoring organisation found that regular passenger cars commonly provided inferior rearward vision compared to SUVs, both because of the prevalence of reversing cameras on modern SUVs and the shape of many popular passenger cars, with their high rear window lines and boots (trunks) obstructing rearward vision. In NRMA testing, two out of 42 SUVs (5%) and 29 out of 163 (18%) regular cars had the worst rating (>15-metre blind spot). Of the vehicles that received a perfect 0-metre blind spot rating, 11 out of 42 (26%) were SUVs and eight out of 163 (5%) were regular passenger cars. All of the "perfect score" vehicles had OEM reversing cameras.

Wide bodies in narrow lanes
The wider bodies of larger vehicles mean they occupy a greater percentage of road lanes. This is particularly noticeable on the narrow roads sometimes found in dense urban areas or rural areas in Europe. Wider vehicles may also have difficulty fitting in some parking spaces and encroach further into traffic lanes when parked alongside the road.

Psychology
SUV safety concerns are affected by a perception among some consumers that SUVs are safer for their drivers than standard cars, and that they need not take basic precautions as if they were inside a "defensive capsule". According to G. C. Rapaille, a psychological consultant to automakers, many consumers feel safer in SUVs simply because their ride height makes "[their passengers] higher and dominate and look down [sic]. That you can look down [on other people] is psychologically a very powerful notion." This and the height and weight of SUVs may lead to consumers' perception of safety.

Gladwell also noted that SUV popularity is also a sign that people began to shift automobile safety focus from active to passive, to the point that in the US potential SUV buyers will give up an extra  of braking distance because they believe they are helpless to avoid a tractor-trailer hit on any vehicle. The four-wheel drive option available to SUVs reinforced the passive safety notion. To support Gladwell's argument, he mentioned that automotive engineer David Champion noted that in his previous driving experience with Range Rover, his vehicle slid across a four-lane road because he did not perceive the slipping that others had experienced. Gladwell concluded that when a driver feels unsafe when driving a vehicle, it makes the vehicle safer. When a driver feels safe when driving, the vehicle becomes less safe.

Stephen Popiel, a vice president of Millward Brown Goldfarb automotive market-research company, noted that for most automotive consumers, safety has to do with the notion that they are not in complete control. Gladwell argued that many "accidents" are not outside driver's control, such as drunk driving, wearing seat belts, and the driver's age and experience.

Sense of security

Study into the safety of SUVs conclusions have been mixed. In 2004, the National Highway Traffic Safety Administration released results of a study that indicated that drivers of SUVs were 11% more likely to die in an accident than people in cars. These figures were not driven by vehicle inherent safety alone but indicated perceived increased security on the part of drivers.  For example, US SUV drivers were found to be less likely to wear their seatbelts and showed a tendency to drive more recklessly (most sensationally perhaps, in a 1996 finding that SUV drivers were more likely to drive drunk).

Actual driver death rates are monitored by the IIHS and vary between models. These statistics do show average driver death rates in the US were lower in larger vehicles from 2002 to 2005, and that there was significant overlap between vehicle categories.

The IIHS report states, "Pound for pound across vehicle types, cars almost always have lower death rates than pickups or SUVs." The NHTSA recorded occupant (driver or passenger) fatalities per 100 million vehicle miles traveled at 1.16 in 2004 and 1.20 in 2003 for light trucks (SUVs, pick-ups and minivans) compared to 1.18 in 2004 and 1.21 in 2003 for passenger cars (all other vehicles).

Marketing practices
The marketing techniques used to sell SUVs have been under criticism. Advertisers and manufacturers alike have been assailed for greenwashing. Critics have cited SUV commercials that show the product being driven through a wilderness area, even though relatively few SUVs are ever driven off-road.

Fuel economy
The recent growth of SUVs is sometimes given as one reason why the population has begun to consume more gasoline than in previous years. SUVs generally use more fuel than passenger vehicles or minivans with the same number of seats. Additionally, SUVs up to 8,500 pounds GVWR are classified by the US government as light trucks, and thus are subject to the less strict light truck standard under the Corporate Average Fuel Economy (CAFE) regulations, and SUVs which exceed 8,500 pounds GVWR have been entirely exempt from CAFE standards. This provides less incentive for US manufacturers to produce more fuel-efficient models.

As a result of their off-road design SUVs may have fuel-inefficient features. High profile increases wind resistance and greater mass require heavier suspensions and larger drivetrains, which both contribute to increased vehicle weight. Some SUVs come with tires designed for off-road traction rather than low rolling resistance.

Fuel economy factors include:

Average data for vehicle types sold in the US:

Drag resistance (assuming the same drag coefficient which is not a safe assumption) for SUVs may be 30% higher and the acceleration force has to be 35% larger for the same acceleration, which again is not a safe assumption, than family sedans if we use the figures from the above table.

Pollution
Because SUVs tend to use more fuel (mile for mile) than cars with the same engine type, they generate higher volumes of pollutants (particularly carbon dioxide) into the atmosphere. This has been confirmed by LCA (Life Cycle Assessment) studies, which quantify the environmental impacts of products such as cars, often from the time they are produced until they are recycled. One LCA study which took into account the production of greenhouse gases, carcinogens, and waste production found that exclusive cars, sports cars and SUVs were "characterized by a poor environmental performance." Another study found that family size internal combustion vehicles still produced fewer emissions than a hybrid SUV.

Various eco-activist groups, such as the Earth Liberation Front or Les Dégonflés have targeted SUV dealerships and privately owned SUVs due to concern over increased fuel usage.

In the US, light trucks and SUVs are held to a less-strict pollution control standard than passenger cars. In response to the perception that a growing share of fuel consumption and emissions are attributable to these vehicles, the Environmental Protection Agency ruled that by the model year 2009, emissions from all light trucks and passenger cars will be regulated equally.

However, total mileage overtime must be taken into consideration when considering total emissions volume and there has been investigated in "Dust to Dust" environmental impact, considering factors other than fuel economy.

The British national newspaper The Independent reported on a study carried out by CNW Marketing Research which suggested that CO2 emissions alone do not reflect the true environmental costs of a car. The newspaper reported that: "CNW moves beyond the usual CO2 emissions figures and uses a "dust-to-dust" calculation of a car's environmental impact, from its creation to its ultimate destruction." The newspaper also reported that the CNW research put the Jeep Wrangler above the Toyota Prius and other hybrid cars as the greenest car that could be bought in the US. However, it was noted that Toyota disputed the proportion of energy used to make a car compared with how much the vehicle uses during its life; CNW said 80% of the energy a car uses is accounted for by manufacture and 20% in use. Toyota claimed the reverse.

The report has raised controversy. When Oregon radio station KATU asked for comment on the CNW report, Professor John Heywood (with the Massachusetts Institute of Technology (MIT)) saw merit in the study saying, "It raises...some good questions" but "I can only guess at how they did the detailed arithmetic.... The danger is a report like this will discourage the kind of thinking we want consumers to do  –  should I invest in this new technology, should I help this new technology?"

The Rocky Mountain Institute alleged that even after making assumptions that would lower the environmental impact of the Hummer H3 relative to the Prius, "the Prius still has a lower impact on the environment. This indicates that the unpublished assumptions and inputs used by CNW must continue the trend of favoring the Hummer or disfavoring the Prius. Since the researchers at Argonne Labs performed a careful survey of all recent life cycle analysis of cars, especially hybrids, our research underlines the deep divide between CNW's study and all scientifically reviewed and accepted work on the same topic."

A report done by the Pacific Institute alleges "serious biases and flaws" in the study published by CNW, claiming that "the report's conclusions rely on faulty methods of analysis, untenable assumptions, selective use and presentation of data, and a complete lack of peer review."

For his part, CNW's Art Spinella says environmental campaigners may be right about SUVs, but hybrids are an expensive part of the automotive picture. The vehicle at the top of his environmentally-friendly list is the Scion xB because it is easy to build, cheap to run and recycle, and carries a cost of 49 cents a mile over its lifetime. "I don't like the Hummer people using that as an example to justify the fact that they bought a Hummer," he said. "Just as it's not for Prius owners to necessarily believe that they're saving the entire globe, the environment for the entire world, that's not true either."

In the June 2008 "From Dust to Dust" study, the Prius cost per lifetime-mile fell 23.5%, to $2.19 per lifetime mile, while the H3 cost rose 12.5%, to $2.33 per lifetime-mile. Actual results depend upon the distance driven during the vehicle's life.

Greenhouse gas emissions 
Unmodified, SUVs emit 700 megatonnes of carbon dioxide per year, which causes global warming. Whereas SUVs can be electrified, their (manufacturing) emissions will always be larger than smaller electric cars. They can also be converted to run on a variety of alternative fuels, including hydrogen. That said, the vast majority of these vehicles are not converted to use alternative fuels.

Weight and size
The weight of a passenger vehicle has a direct statistical contribution to its driver fatality rate according to Informed for LIFE, more weight being beneficial (to the occupant).

The length and especially width of large SUVs is controversial in urban areas. In areas with limited parking spaces, large SUV drivers have been criticized for parking in stalls marked for compact cars or that are too narrow for the width of larger vehicles. Critics have stated that this causes problems such as the loss of use of the adjacent space, reduced accessibility into the entry of an adjacent vehicle, blockage of driveway space, and damage inflicted, by the door, to adjacent vehicles. As a backlash against the alleged space consumption of SUVs, the city of Florence, has restricted access of SUVs to the center, and Paris and Vienna have debated banning them altogether.

Despite common perceptions, SUVs often have equivalent or less interior storage space than wagons. While handling worse and burning more fuel due to high centre of gravity and weight respectively.

Activism
Siân Berry was a founder of the Alliance against Urban 4×4s, which began in Camden in 2003 and became a national campaign demanding measures to stop 4×4s (or sport utility vehicles) "taking over our cities". The campaign was known for its "theatrical demonstrations" and mock parking tickets, credited to Berry (although now adapted by numerous local groups).

In Sweden, a group which called themselves "Asfaltsdjungelns indianer" (en: The Indians of the asphalt jungle), carried out actions in Stockholm, Gothenburg, Malmö and a number of smaller cities. The group, created in 2007, released the air from the tires on an estimated 300 SUVs during their first year. Their mission was to highlight the high fuel consumption of SUVs, as they thought that SUV owners did not have the right to drive such big vehicles at the expense of others. The group received some attention in media, and declared a truce in December 2007.

Similar activist groups, most likely inspired by the Swedish group, have carried out actions in Denmark, Scotland, and Finland.

See also
Automobile safety
Environmental impact of transport
Air pollution
Environmental aspects of the electric car
Gas-guzzler

References

Sport Utility Vehicles
Sport utility vehicles